Roots and Shadows is an English-language Indian novel, written by Shashi Deshpande in 1983. 

The novel focuses on Indu's interactions with others in her large family and the manner in which this helps to resolve their future and her own personal crisis.

Characters

First generation 

Akka – The female matriarch of the family
Indu's grandfather
Old Uncle - Indu's grandfather's cousin

Second generation 

Narmada  Atya - Indu's aunt
Anant Kaka - Indu's uncle
Govind - Indu's father
Madhav Kaka and Sumitra Kaki - Indu's aunt and uncle
Vinay Kaka and Kamala Kaki - Indu's aunt and uncle
Sunanda Atya and Vasant Kaka - Indu's aunt and uncle
Saroja - Naren's mother

Third generation 

Indu - Govind's daughter and the main protagonist
Naren - Saroja's son and Indu's illicit partner
Jayant - Indu's husband
Hemant - Anant kaka and kaki's children
Sumant - Anant kaka and kaki's children
Padmini - Anant kaka and kaki's children
Sharad -Anant kaka and kaki's children
Sunil - Madhav kaka and Sumitra kaki's children
Lata - Madhav kaka and Sumitra kaki's children
Geeta -Madhav kaka and Sumitra kaki's children
Vithal - the adopted Brahmin boy

Fourth generation 
 Vishwas - Hemant's children
 Sanju - Hemant's children

Themes 
 Marriage
 Joint-family system
 Infidelity
 Class and caste relations
 Feminism
 Modernism

Analysis and criticism 
The work has been widely analysed and criticized for its feminist orientation. It has been a source for many thesis and papers on the role of women in society of today. The work is widely appreciated for bringing out the joint family system in Indian society.

References 

1983 Indian novels